In mathematics, a line integral is an integral where the function to be integrated is evaluated along a curve.  The terms path integral, curve integral, and curvilinear integral are also used; contour integral is used as well, although that is typically reserved for line integrals in the complex plane.

The function to be integrated may be a scalar field or a vector field. The value of the line integral is the sum of values of the field at all points on the curve, weighted by some scalar function on the curve (commonly arc length or, for a vector field, the scalar product of the vector field with a differential vector in the curve). This weighting distinguishes the line integral from simpler integrals defined on intervals.

Vector calculus 
In qualitative terms, a line integral in vector calculus can be thought of as a measure of the total effect of a given tensor field along a given curve. For example, the line integral over a scalar field (rank 0 tensor) can be interpreted as the area under the field carved out by a particular curve. This can be visualized as the surface created by z = f(x,y) and a curve C in the xy plane. The line integral of f would be the area of the "curtain" created—when the points of the surface that are directly over C are carved out.

Line integral of a scalar field

Definition 
For some scalar field  where , the line integral along a piecewise smooth curve  is defined as

Here, and in the rest of the article, the absolute value bars denote the standard (Euclidean) norm of a vector.

The function  is called the integrand, the curve  is the domain of integration, and the symbol  may be intuitively interpreted as an elementary arc length of the curve  (i.e., a differential length of ).

See the animation to the right.

Derivation 
This can be done by partitioning the interval  into  sub-intervals  of length , then  denotes some point, call it a sample point, on the curve . (The approximation of a curve to a polygonal path is called rectification of a curve, see here for more details.) Taking the limit of the sum of the terms as the length of the partitions approaches zero gives us

By the mean value theorem, the distance between subsequent points on the curve, is

Substituting this in the above Riemann sum yields

which is the Riemann sum for the integral

Line integral of a vector field

Definition 
For a vector field F: U ⊆ Rn → Rn, the line integral along a piecewise smooth curve C ⊂ U, in the direction of r, is defined as

where · is the dot product, and r: [a, b] → C is a bijective parametrization of the curve C such that r(a) and r(b) give the endpoints of C.

A line integral of a scalar field is thus a line integral of a vector field, where the vectors are always tangential to the line of the integration.

Line integrals of vector fields are independent of the parametrization r in absolute value, but they do depend on its orientation. Specifically, a reversal in the orientation of the parametrization changes the sign of the line integral.

From the viewpoint of differential geometry, the line integral of a vector field along a curve is the integral of the corresponding 1-form under the musical isomorphism (which takes the vector field to the corresponding covector field), over the curve considered as an immersed 1-manifold.

Derivation 

The line integral of a vector field can be derived in a manner very similar to the case of a scalar field, but this time with the inclusion of a dot product. We partition the interval  (which is the range of the values of the parameter ) into  intervals of length . However, instead of calculating up the distances between subsequent points, we need to calculate their displacement vectors, . Letting the size of the partitions go to zero gives us a sum

By the mean value theorem, we see that the displacement vector between adjacent points on the curve is

Substituting this in the above Riemann sum yields

which is the Riemann sum for the integral defined above.

Path independence 

If a vector field F is the gradient of a scalar field G (i.e. if F is conservative), that is,

then by the multivariable chain rule the derivative of the composition of G and r(t) is

which happens to be the integrand for the line integral of F on r(t). It follows, given a path C , that

In other words, the integral of F over C depends solely on the values of G at the points r(b) and r(a), and is thus independent of the path between them.  For this reason, a line integral of a conservative vector field is called path independent.

Applications 
The line integral has many uses in physics. For example, the work done on a particle traveling on a curve C inside a force field represented as a vector field F is the line integral of F on C.

Flow across a curve 

Complex line integral 
In complex analysis, the line integral is defined in terms of multiplication and addition of complex numbers. The line integral

may be defined by subdividing the interval [a, b] into  and considering the expression

The integral is then the limit of this Riemann sum as the lengths of the subdivision intervals approach zero.

If the parametrization  is continuously differentiable, the line integral can be evaluated as an integral of a function of a real variable:

When  is a closed curve (initial and final points coincide), the line integral is often denoted  sometimes referred to in engineering as a cyclic integral.

The line integral with respect to the conjugate complex differential  is defined to be

The line integrals of complex functions can be evaluated using a number of techniques. The most direct is to split into real and imaginary parts, reducing the problem to evaluating two real-valued line integrals. The Cauchy integral theorem may be used to equate the line integral of an analytic function to the same integral over a more convenient curve. It also implies that over a closed curve enclosing a region where  is analytic without singularities, the value of the integral is simply zero, or in case the region includes singularities, the residue theorem computes the integral in terms of the singularities. This also implies the path independence of complex line integral for analytic functions.

Example 
Consider the function f(z) = 1/z, and let the contour L be the counterclockwise unit circle about 0, parametrized by z(t) = eit with t in [0, 2π] using the complex exponential. Substituting, we find:

This is a typical result of Cauchy's integral formula and the residue theorem.

Relation of complex line integral and line integral of vector field 
Viewing complex numbers as 2-dimensional vectors, the line integral of a complex-valued function  has real and complex parts equal to the line integral and the flux integral of the vector field corresponding to the conjugate function  Specifically, if  parametrizes L, and  corresponds to the vector field  then:

By Cauchy's theorem, the left-hand integral is zero when  is analytic (satisfying the Cauchy–Riemann equations) for any smooth closed curve L. Correspondingly, by Green's theorem, the right-hand integrals are zero when  is irrotational (curl-free) and incompressible (divergence-free).

By Green's theorem, the area of a region enclosed by a smooth, closed, positively oriented curve  is given by the integral  This fact is used, for example, in the proof of the area theorem.

Quantum mechanics 
The path integral formulation of quantum mechanics actually refers not to path integrals in this sense but to functional integrals, that is, integrals over a space of paths, of a function of a possible path. However, path integrals in the sense of this article are important in quantum mechanics; for example, complex contour integration is often used in evaluating probability amplitudes in quantum scattering theory.

See also 

 Divergence theorem
 Gradient theorem
 Methods of contour integration
 Nachbin's theorem
 Surface integral
 Volume element
 Volume integral

References

External links 
 
 Khan Academy modules:
 "Introduction to the Line Integral"
 "Line Integral Example 1"
 "Line Integral Example 2 (part 1)"
 "Line Integral Example 2 (part 2)"
 
 Line integral of a vector field – Interactive

Complex analysis
Vector calculus